The R.F. Outen Pottery is a historic industrial facility at 430 Jefferson Street in Matthews, North Carolina.  The roughly  property includes a brick kiln, and a concrete-block workshop, both built about 1952 by Rufus Outen.  Abutting the workshop to the north is a metal roofed and sided shed, in which Outen stored clay.  Outen, trained by his father at the Matthews Pottery, produced utilitarian folk pottery on these premises until his retirement in 1976.  The facility is a well-preserved example of a complete mid-20th century folk pottery works.

The property was listed on the National Register of Historic Places in 2015.

See also
National Register of Historic Places listings in Mecklenburg County, North Carolina

References

Industrial buildings and structures on the National Register of Historic Places in North Carolina
Industrial buildings completed in 1845
Manufacturing companies based in North Carolina
Buildings and structures in Mecklenburg County, North Carolina
Ceramics manufacturers of the United States
National Register of Historic Places in Mecklenburg County, North Carolina